Joel Krosnick (born 1941, New Haven, Connecticut) is an American cellist who has performed as a soloist, recitalist, and chamber musician  throughout the world for over 40 years. As a member of the Juilliard String Quartet from 1974 to 2016, he performed the great quartet literature throughout North America, Europe, Asia, and Australia.

Early life
Joel Krosnick was born in 1941 to a family of enthusiastic amateur musicians—his mother was a pianist, his father a violinist/doctor. There was so much recorded and live chamber music in his home that by the time Joel was twelve years old, he had played most of the Classical and Romantic piano trio literature with his mother and (now professional) violinist brother, Aaron. By the age of 17, he had read much of the standard quartet repertory with his family and friends.

Attending Columbia University, Joel became involved with composers and new music, eventually becoming a founding member of The Group for Contemporary Music. The connection with the music of his time has become a lifelong passion for Krosnick and has led to premieres and performances of the works by such composers as Roger Sessions, Elliott Carter, Charles Wuorinen, Ralph Shapey, Richard Wernick, Stefan Wolpe, Perry Goldstein, Milton Babbitt, Paul Zonn, Donald Martino, Stanley Walden, and Morton Subotnick.

His work
Krosnick has recorded the complete quartets of Beethoven, Bartók, Schoenberg, Janáček, Hindemith, and Brahms, as well as the last ten quartets of Mozart, four quartets of Elliott Carter, and works of Debussy, Ravel, Dutilleux, Berg, Smetana, Roger Sessions, Franck, Verdi, Donald Martino, Stefan Wolpe, Bach, and Haydn.

With his sonata partner of over twenty years, pianist Gilbert Kalish, Krosnick has performed recitals throughout the United States and Europe. Since 1976, they have given an annual series of recitals at Weill and Merkin Halls, as well as at Miller and Juilliard Theatres. In 1984, Krosnick and Kalish gave a six-concert retrospective of twentieth-century music for cello and piano at the Juilliard Theatre and at the Library of Congress in Washington, D.C.

With Gilbert Kalish, Krosnick has recorded for the Arabesque label the Complete Sonatas and Variations of Beethoven and the Sonatas of Brahms, as well as works of Poulenc, Prokofiev, Elliott Carter, Hindemith, Debussy, Janáček, and Henry Cowell. Recently released was a disc of the cello and piano sonatas of Johannes Brahms. Especially noteworthy is a recording devoted to the cello and piano music of Ralph Shapey; soon to be released is a disc of Forgotten Americans, including music of Ernst Bacon, Hall Overton, Ben Weber, and Otto Luening.

In the season of 2002-2003, Krosnick and Kalish performed a pair of recitals at the Juilliard School of Lincoln Center. One of the recitals was a memorial to the composer Ralph Shapey, involving among other Shapey works the Sonata for Cello and Piano (1954), the Kroslish Sonata, and the Songs of Life, as well as the premiere of the Duo Variations for violin and cello, a composition from 1985. The other recital included premieres of works by Gunther Schuller and Richard Wernick, as well as works by Robert Stern and Francis Poulenc.

Particularly noteworthy are premieres of Martino's Cello Concerto in Cincinnati and New York City (with the Juilliard Orchestra); also significant were the premieres of the Shapey Double Concerto for Violin, Cello, and Orchestra (with Robert Mann and the composer conducting the Juilliard Orchestra) and of the Shapey Double Concerto for Cello, Piano, and Double String Orchestra (with Kalish and Shapey conducting the Tanglewood Music Center Orchestra). In October 1999, Krosnick premiered Wernick's Cello Concerto #2 with the Juilliard Orchestra. In January 2001, he played the concerto by Sir Donald Francis Tovey in three performances with the Jupiter Symphony under the baton of Jens Nygaard.

Academic activities
Krosnick has taught cello and chamber music since his earliest professional life. He held professorships at the Universities of Iowa and Massachusetts, and has been artist-in-residence at the California Institute of the Arts. Since 1974, he has been on the faculty of the Juilliard School, where since 1994 he has chaired the cello department. Krosnick has been associated with the Aspen Festival, Marlboro, the Tanglewood Music Center, the Daniel Days Music Festival, Ravinia, Yellow Barn and, presently, Kneisel Hall, of which he is an alumnus. In 1999, he joined for the second time the faculty of the Piatigorsky Seminar at the University of Southern California.

Krosnick holds honorary doctoral degrees from Michigan State University, Jacksonville University, and the San Francisco Conservatory of Music. As a member of the Juilliard String Quartet, he has received numerous Grammy nominations, twice winning the Grammy Award (for the complete Schoenberg Quartets, and for the late quartets of Beethoven). His discs In the Shadow of World War II and In the Shadow of World War I (both with Kalish) won Indie Awards in 1997 and 1999. Their recording of the Brahms Sonatas won the 2002 award from the Classical Recording Foundation.

Krosnick has recorded for the Sony Classical, Nonesuch, Orion, CRI, New World, Koch International, and Arabesque labels.

References 

1941 births
American classical cellists
Arabesque Records artists
Columbia University alumni
Juilliard School faculty
Living people
Juilliard String Quartet members